Nathalie Marina Hendrika Maria Den Dekker  (26 June 1989) is a Dutch lawyer and beauty queen who was crowned Miss Universe Netherlands 2012 and represented her country at the Miss Universe 2012 pageant as well as other international pageants.

Early life
Den Dekker studied Law. Her interests include reading, spending time with friends and family, and swimming. She describes herself as a confident person who is hard-working, friendly and committed.

Designations
Den Dekker is designated as representative for the Netherlands at Miss World and Miss Universe 2012 by Kim Kotter, national director of Miss Nederland as Miss Nederland took place during the Miss Universe competition.

International pageants
2010: Miss Supranational in Poland
2010: Miss Tourism Queen of the Year International in China (Top 20)
2010: Miss Bikini International in China (Top 26，Miss Bikini Healthy Winner)
2010: Miss Tourism International in Malaysia (Winner)
2012: Miss World in China (Top 15)
2012: Miss Universe in the United States (2nd Runner-up in National costume)
2013: Miss International in Japan (1st runner up)

References

External links
Official Miss Nederland 

Living people
Dutch beauty pageant winners
Miss Universe 2012 contestants
Miss International 2013 delegates
Miss World 2012 delegates
1989 births
Dutch female models